Keramuddin Keram (born 1 January 1962) is an Afghan politician who served as Governor of Panjshir Province from 21 April 2010 until 2 November 2013. Keram served as the President of the Afghanistan Football Federation from 2004 until 2019, when he was banned from football for life by FIFA after being accused of sexual abuse by several players from the Afghanistan women's national football team. Keram is currently at large despite an indictment and arrest warrant being issued against him.

Sexual assault allegations
In 2018, an investigation was launched when several players of Afghanistan women's national football team has alleged that Karim sexually assaulted, threatened and physically attacked them.

On June 8, 2019, FIFA barred Keram, who was president of Afghanistan's soccer association, from the sport for life after reports that he had threatened and sexually assaulted players. He was also fined about USD $1 million. Following this, a warrant was issued for his arrest.

In August 2020, special forces attempted to arrest Keram in Panjshir, but were unsuccessful, with Human Rights Watch reporting that Keram had the protection of a local militia. As of April 2021, he remains at large.

See also 
Politics of Afghanistan
List of current governors of Afghanistan
Provinces of Afghanistan

References

External links

1962 births
Governors of Panjshir Province
Living people
Association football executives
Afghan Tajik people